James Lafferty was born in Cohoes, New York on August 3, 1837.

Lafferty was a Democrat who was a member of the Wisconsin State Assembly in 1874.

https://docs.legis.wisconsin.gov/misc/lrb/blue_book/2007_2008/300_feature.pdf

He lived in Empire, Fond du Lac County, Wisconsin.

References

People from Empire, Wisconsin
1837 births
Year of death uncertain
19th-century American politicians
People from Cohoes, New York
Democratic Party members of the Wisconsin State Assembly